Agonopterix hippomarathri is a moth of the family Depressariidae. It is found in France, Italy, Switzerland, Austria, the Czech Republic, Slovakia, Hungary and Ukraine and on Sardinia and Corsica. It has also been recorded from Morocco.

The wingspan is 14–18 mm.

The larvae feed on Seseli hippomarathrum and Trinia glauca.

References

External links
lepiforum.de

Moths described in 1864
Agonopterix
Moths of Europe
Moths of Africa